Bobitz is a municipality in the Nordwestmecklenburg district, in Mecklenburg-Vorpommern, Germany.

People 
 Friedrich Graf von der Schulenburg (1865-1939), Prussian general

References

Municipalities in Mecklenburg-Western Pomerania
Nordwestmecklenburg